Sticherus flabellatus is a small fern found in eastern Australia and in New Zealand, northwards from the north-west of the South Island. A common and attractive plant with shiny dark foliage and with slightly toothed edges on the smallest parts of the fronds. Often seen in large numbers in suitably moist gullies and by creeks.

Two varieties are recognized that differ in size of the sporangia and the size of the ultimate segments. The variety in New South Wales is Sticherus flabellatus var. flabellatus.

In 1810 it appeared as Gleichenia flabellata in Prodromus Florae Novae Hollandiae, authored by Robert Brown.

References 

Gleicheniales
Flora of New South Wales
Flora of Queensland
Flora of Victoria (Australia)
Plants described in 1810